Tyresa Smith (born April 21, 1985) was the 18th overall pick in the 2007 WNBA Draft and was selected in the second round by the Phoenix Mercury. Smith was selected from the University of Delaware where she was the team's second all-time leading scorer and became the first player from UD to be drafted in the WNBA draft. In 2007, she was named the Colonial Athletic Association's Defensive Player Of The Year, led the CAA in scoring, and was named First Team All-CAA after averaging 19.8 points, 7.5 rebounds, and 2.6 steals per game. She was also the CAA Defensive Player of the Year in 2006. On August 19, 2007 she was signed by the Detroit Shock.

Smith grew up in Dover, Delaware and played high school basketball for Polytech High School. She led the team to a state championship in 2003 as a senior and was named the state of Delaware's female basketball player of the year. She shared the Delaware Sportswriters and Broadcasters Association award as Delaware's Outstanding Athlete of 2007.

Delaware  statistics
Source

References

External links
WNBA Profile
Smith signed by Detroit Shock
Profile at Eurobasket.com

1985 births
Living people
American women's basketball players
Basketball players from Delaware
Delaware Fightin' Blue Hens women's basketball players
Detroit Shock players
People from Dover, Delaware
Phoenix Mercury draft picks